Toast is a play written in 1999 by English playwright Richard Bean. It premiered at the Royal Court Theatre, London in 1999. The play tells the story of seven men who all work in a bread factory in Hull. One Sunday night, Nellie is so worn down from a lifetime making dough, he loses his vest in the mix.

Original Cast
Christopher Campbell - Lance
Ian Dunn - Colin
Matthew Dunster - Peter
Ewan Hooper - Walter Nelson (Nellie)
Sam Kelly - Cecil
Mark Williams - Blakey
Paul Wyett - Dezzie

2007 Revival
March 2007 at Hull Truck Theatre, Directed by Gareth Tudor-Price. 
Jonathan Hansler - Lance
Andrew Whitehead - Colin
Paul Popplewell - Peter
Edward Peel - Walter Nelson (Nellie)
Martin Barrass - Cecil
Andy Fox - Blakey 
Patrick Connolly - Dezzie

2014 Revival
August 2014 at The Park Theatre, Directed by Eleanor Rhode for Snapdragon Productions.
Matthew Kelly - Walter Nelson (Nellie)
Simon Greenall - Cecil
Steve Nicolson - Blakey
Will Barton - Colin
Matt Sutton - Peter
Finlay Robertson - Dezzie
John Wark - Lance

On 9 September 2015 it was announced that Snapdragon Productions's 2014 revival would embark on a UK Tour and transfer to the Brits off Broadway Festival in 2016 with Kieran Knowles taking over the role of Dezzie.

References

1999 plays
Plays by Richard Bean
Plays set in England